Serendipity Arts Festival is an annual arts festival held in Panaji, Goa over a week in late December. It was founded in 2016 by Sunil Kant Munjal, chairman of Hero Enterprise. It is the only arts festival in the country whose programming spans multi-disciplinary fields such as art, theatre, music, literature, dance, food and crafts. The festival's inter-disciplinary approach has been reported in Indian media, along with its impact on "India's art scene".

Admission to the festival is free, and in 2018 it received 450,000 visitors. For the 2019 edition, the festival took over 12 venues, including some of the heritage structures along the Mandovi river, and featured over 95 projects, including workshops, live performances and art exhibitions. 

The festival is organised by the non-profit Serendipity Arts Foundation. Every edition is programmed by a new curatorial team, which includes established figures in particular fields; in 2019, the visual arts programming was curated by artists Jyotindra Jain and Sudarshan Shetty, culinary arts by chef Rahul Akerkar, dance by Mayuri Upadhya, music by Sneha Khanwalkar, among others.

References

External links
Official website

Tourist attractions in Goa
Festivals in Goa
Theatre festivals in India
Festivals established in 2016
December events
Arts festivals in India
2016 establishments in Goa
Annual events in India